Hisonotus alberti is a species of catfish in the family Loricariidae. It is a freshwater species native to the basins of the Paraná River and the São Francisco River in Brazil. The species was described in 2016. and is not listed by FishBase.

References 

Otothyrinae
Fish of the São Francisco River basin
Fish described in 2016